Tatyana Vorokhobko (born 5 December 1950) is a Soviet athlete. She competed in the women's pentathlon at the 1976 Summer Olympics.

References

1950 births
Living people
Athletes (track and field) at the 1976 Summer Olympics
Soviet pentathletes
Olympic athletes of the Soviet Union
Athletes from Saint Petersburg
Universiade silver medalists for the Soviet Union
Universiade medalists in athletics (track and field)
Medalists at the 1970 Summer Universiade
Medalists at the 1973 Summer Universiade